The Thomas-Morse MB-7 was an American racing plane built by Thomas-Morse Aircraft for the US Navy.

Development and design 

The MB-7 was built on the request of the US Navy.  They had recently received the Thomas-Morse MB-3, and asked B Douglas Thomas to modify two of them to be racers.  The first MB-7 was completed in 1921. It took part in the 1921 Pulitzer Trophy race, but during the race its fuel pump malfunctioned and it crashed and was destroyed by fire when a lighted match by a souvenir hunter ignited the fuel. The second MB-7 was completed in January 1922. It first flew on 14 April 1922. It competed for the US Navy in the Pulitzer Trophy on 14 October 1922. Piloted by Captain Francis Pat Mulcahy it withdrew after 30 minutes with an overheating engine. It never flew again before being dismantled on 7 January 1925.

Operators

United States Navy

Specifications

References

Notes

Bibliography

External links

1920s United States sport aircraft
High-wing aircraft
Single-engined tractor aircraft
Aircraft first flown in 1921